Macaubal is a municipality in the state of São Paulo in Brazil. The population is 8,147 (2020 est.) in an area of 248 km². The elevation is 516 m.

See also
 List of municipalities in the state of São Paulo by population

References

Municipalities in São Paulo (state)